Liberia has sent athletes to every Summer Olympic Games held since 1956 with the exception of 1968, 1976, 1980 and 1992, although the country has never won an Olympic medal.  No athletes from Liberia have competed in any Winter Olympic Games.

The National Olympic Committee for Liberia was formed in 1954 and recognized by the International Olympic Committee in 1955.

Medal tables

By Summer Games

See also
 List of flag bearers for Liberia at the Olympics
 Liberia at the Paralympics

External links